The 2015–16 Maine Black Bears women's basketball team will represent the University of Maine in the America East Conference. The Black Bears are led by fifth year head coach Richard Barron and play their home games at the Cross Insurance Center. They finished the season 26–9, 15–1 in America East play to share the America East regular season title with Albany. They advanced to the championship game of the America East women's tournament where they lost to Albany. As champs of the America East Conference who failed to win their conference tournament, they received an automatic bid to the Women's National Invitation Tournament where they lost to Quinnipiac in the first round.

Media
All home games and conference road games will stream on either ESPN3 or AmericaEast.tv. Most road games will stream on the opponents website. All games will be broadcast on the radio on WGUY and online on the Maine Portal.

Roster

Schedule

|-
!colspan=12 style="background:#000050; color:#FFFFFF;"| Exhibition

|-
!colspan=12 style="background:#000050; color:#FFFFFF;"| Non-conference regular season

|-
!colspan=12 style="background:#000050; color:#FFFFFF;"| America East regular season

|-
!colspan=12 style="background:#000050; color:#FFFFFF;"| America East Women's Tournament

|-
!colspan=12 style="background:#000050; color:#FFFFFF;"| WNIT

See also
2015–16 Maine Black Bears men's basketball team
Maine Black Bears women's basketball

References

Maine
Maine Black Bears women's basketball seasons
2016 Women's National Invitation Tournament participants
Maine
Maine